Alex Livingston is a Canadian poker player. In 2019 he placed 3rd in the World Series of Poker Main Event. He also finished  13th at the Main Event in 2013. Livingston was raised in Halifax, Nova Scotia. He is also a chess player and studied economics at Tufts University.
Away from the tables Alex is an avid skier, golfer and writer.

References

Canadian poker players
Canadian chess players
Tufts University School of Arts and Sciences alumni

Living people

Year of birth missing (living people)